Infiniheart is an album by Canadian artist Chad VanGaalen. It was originally released in 2004 on Flemish Eye and was rereleased in 2005 on Sub Pop.  The album was recorded in a makeshift studio in VanGaalen's basement, and uses a diverse array of instruments and equipment, almost all played by VanGaalen and some handmade by the artist. Overall, Infiniheart received favorable reviews and drew comparisons to The Flaming Lips and Neil Young.

Track listing
"Clinically Dead" – 2:18
"After the Afterlife" – 3:38
"Kill Me in My Sleep" – 5:58
"The Warp Zone/Hidden Bridge" – 4:13
"J.C.'s Head on the Cross" – 3:18
"Somewhere I Know There Is Nothing" – 4:14
"Blood Machine" – 4:25
"Echo Train" – 3:19
"Build a Home Like a Bee" – 2:13
"I Miss You Like I Miss You" – 2:59
"Human Totem" – 2:56
"Red Blood" – 4:02
"1000 Pound Eyelids" – 3:29
"Graduated Assassin" – 2:53
"Chronograph #1" – 3:23
"Sunshine Snare Hits" – 3:58
"Liquid + Light" – 2:32
"Dolphinariums" – 2:21
"Traffic" – 2:48

Rerelease in 2005
The album was rereleased on August 23, 2005 on Sub Pop with a different track listing.
"Clinically Dead"
"After the Afterlife"
"Kill Me in My Sleep"
"J.C.'s Head on the Cross"
"Somewhere I Know There Is Nothing"
"Blood Machine"
"Echo Train"
"Build a Home Like a Bee"
"I Miss You Like I Miss You"
"Red Blood"
"1000 Pound Eyelids"
"The Warp Zone/Hidden Bridge"
"Chronograph #1"
"Sunshine Snare Hits"
"Liquid + Light"
"Traffic"

References

2004 debut albums
Chad VanGaalen albums
Flemish Eye albums
Sub Pop albums